Kien Svay is a district (srok) of Kandal Province, Cambodia. The district is subdivided into 12 communes (khum): Banteay Daek, Chheu Teal, Dei Edth, Kampong Svay, Kbal Kaoh, Kokir, Kokir Thum, Phum Thum, Preaek Aeng, Preaek Thmei, Samraong Thum, Veal Sbov; and 46 villages (phum).

Near the town is a "resort" of small shacks on stilts above a river.  This is a popular weekend jaunt for Phnom Penh residents.

Kien Svay District lies on road number 1. It is connected between Phnom Penh Capital to Svay Rieng Province.

Most people here are farmers.

Education

 High schools
 Jayavarman VII High School
 Samrong Thom Sannivo High School
 Hun Sen Serei Dei Dosh High School

 Secondary schools
 Banteay Daek Secondary School
 Kokir Secondary School
 Kokir Thom Secondary School
 Roteang Secondary School
 Ruessei Srok Secondary School

Gallery

References

External links
Kandal at Royal Government of Cambodia website
Kandal at Ministry of Commerce website

Districts of Kandal province